Archibald Wickeramaraja Singham, also known as Archie Singham or A. W. Singham (1932-1991) was a Sri Lankan political scientist and historian, professor of political science at Brooklyn College of City University of New York. He was an authority on the Caribbean and a participant in the Non-Aligned Movement.

Life
Archie Singham was born in Burma to Sri Lankan parents. He was educated in Sri Lanka before doing his bachelors at Wesleyan University. He married Shirley Hune, who later became the associate provost of Hunter College.

Singham became one of the founding members of the Department of Government at the University of the West Indies – Mona, and taught there from 1960 to 1970. He also gained a masters from the University of Michigan, and in 1967 completed his Ph.D. there.

Singham taught briefly at the University of Michigan before being one of the black scholars recruited by Andrew Billingsley to Howard University at the end of the 1960s. He also taught at the University of Manchester in England before moving to Brooklyn College in 1978. In testimony to the US Congress, Singham criticized the 1983 United States invasion of Grenada, and called for the US to withdraw its troops.

Singham died on 13 March 1991. Two books on peace were dedicated to Singham's memory.

His son is the software entrepreneur Roy Singham.

Works
 
 Readings in government and politics of the West Indies. Kingston, Jamaica: Printed by Instant Letter Service Co., 1967.
 The hero and the crowd in a colonial polity. New Haven: Yale University Press, 1968.
 
 (with N. L. Singham) 
 (ed.) The Commonwealth Caribbean into the seventies : proceedings of a conference held on 28–30 September 1973 at Howard University, Washington, D.C. Montreal: Center for Developing-Area Studies, McGill University, 1975.
 (ed. with Tran Van Dinh) From Bandung to Colombo : conferences of the non-aligned countries, 1955-75. New York: Third Press Review Books, 1976.
 
 (ed.) The Nonaligned movement in world politics: a symposium held at Howard Univerty. Includes proceedings of the Sri Lanka Nonalignment conference. Westport, Conn.: Lawrence Hill, 1977.
 (with Shirley Hune) The non-aligned movement and the Namibian question. Chandigarh, India: Centre for Research in Rural & Industrial Development, 1985.
 (with Shirley Hune) Non-alignment in an age of alignments. Westport, Conn.: L. Hill; London: Zed Books, 1986.

References

1932 births
1991 deaths
Wesleyan University alumni
University of Michigan alumni
University of the West Indies academics
University of Michigan faculty
Howard University faculty
Brooklyn College faculty
Sri Lankan political scientists
20th-century Sri Lankan historians
People from British Ceylon
American people of Sri Lankan Tamil descent
20th-century political scientists